Diplodactylus is a genus of geckos of the family Diplodactylidae from Australia. They are sometimes called stone geckos or fat-tailed geckos. Member species are morphologically similar but genetically distinct.

Species
The following 27 species are included in Diplodactylus:

Diplodactylus ameyi  – eastern deserts fat-tailed gecko
Diplodactylus barraganae  – gulf fat-tailed gecko
Diplodactylus bilybara  – western fat-tailed gecko
Diplodactylus calcicolus  – south coast gecko
Diplodactylus capensis  – Cape Range stone gecko
Diplodactylus conspicillatus  – burrow-plug gecko, variable fat-tailed gecko
Diplodactylus custos  – Kimberley fat-tailed gecko
Diplodactylus fulleri  – Lake Disappointment ground gecko
Diplodactylus furcosus  – forked gecko, Ranges stone gecko
Diplodactylus galaxias  – Northern Pilbara beak-faced gecko
Diplodactylus galeatus  – helmeted gecko
Diplodactylus granariensis  – western stone gecko
Diplodactylus hillii  – northern fat-tailed gecko
Diplodactylus kenneallyi  – Kenneally's gecko
Diplodactylus klugei  – Kluge's gecko
Diplodactylus laevis  – desert fat-tailed gecko
Diplodactylus lateroides  – speckled stone gecko
Diplodactylus mitchelli  – Pilbara stone gecko
Diplodactylus nebulosus 
Diplodactylus ornatus  – ornate stone gecko
Diplodactylus platyurus  – eastern fat-tailed gecko
Diplodactylus polyophthalmus  – spotted sandplain gecko
Diplodactylus pulcher  – fine-faced gecko
Diplodactylus savagei  – yellow-spotted Pilbara gecko
Diplodactylus tessellatus  – tessellated gecko
Diplodactylus vittatus  – eastern stone gecko, stone gecko, wood gecko
Diplodactylus wiru  – desert wood gecko

Nota bene: A binomial authority in parentheses indicates that the species was originally described in a genus other than Diplodactylus.

References

Further reading
Gray JE (1832). "Characters of a New Genus of Mammalia, and of a New Genus and two New Species of Lizards, from New Holland". Proceedings of the Zoological Society of London 1832: 39–40. (Diplodactylus, new genus, p. 40). (in English and Latin).

 
Geckos of Australia
Lizard genera
Taxa named by John Edward Gray